Pangio agma is a species of ray-finned fish in the genus Pangio. It is endemic to Borneo where it is found in northern Sarawak and Brunei. It grows to  SL.

References

Pangio
Endemic fauna of Borneo
Freshwater fish of East Malaysia
Fauna of Brunei
Fish described in 1992
Freshwater fish of Borneo